Afro-punk (sometimes spelled Afro-Punk, Afropunk or AfroPunk) refers to the participation of African Americans and other Black people in punk and alternative subcultures, especially in the United States.

History
The term originated from the 2003 documentary Afro-Punk directed by James Spooner.

In the early 21st century, Afro-punks made up a minority in the North American punk scene.  Notable bands that can be linked to the Afro-punk community include: Death, Pure Hell, Bad Brains, Suicidal Tendencies, Dead Kennedys, Fishbone, Wesley Willis Fiasco, Suffrajett, The Templars, Unlocking the Truth and Rough Francis. In the United Kingdom, influential black musicians associated with the late 1970s punk scene included Poly Styrene of X-Ray Spex, Don Letts and Basement 5. Afro-punk has become a movement, comparable to the early hip hop movement of the 1980s. The Afropunk Music Festival was founded in 2005 by James Spooner and Matthew Morgan.

Festivals
AfroPunk has Festivals in 5 locations. The 2019 Brooklyn AfroPunk Festival took place on August 24 and 25. The Atlanta AfroPunk will take place October 12 and 13. There will also be festivals in London, Paris, and Joburg. The line-up for the festivals vary depending on location, but include artists, Jill Scott, Anderson Paak, FKA Twigs, Leon Bridges, Danny Brown, Smino, Tierra Whack, Ho99o9, Earth Gang, Kamasi Washington, Santigold, Fever 333, Leikeli47, Mahalia, and many more.

References

External links
Afro-Punk Film Official Site
AfroPunk Festival Official Site
"The True Story Of How Afropunk Turned A Message Board Into A Movement, The Fader, August 21, 2015
"Afro-Punk Scene Explodes Into A Multi-Genre Movement", MTV, December 12, 2008
"Truly Indie Fans", The New York Times

21st-century music genres
Punk
African-American culture
African-American music
DIY culture
Underground culture